Asma al-Ghul (also Al Ghoul,  Alghoul ) is a secular Palestinian feminist journalist who writes for the Ramallah-based newspaper Al-Ayyam, chronicling what she calls “the corruption of Fatah and the terrorism of Hamas.” Al-Ayyam is sometimes banned in Gaza by Hamas. Al-Ghul is described by The New York Times as "known for her defiant stance against violations of civil rights in Gaza."

Al-Ghul was born in 1982 in Rafah, a Gazan city bordering Egypt whose population is mainly Palestinian refugees. In 2003, she married an Egyptian poet and moved to Abu Dhabi. She and her husband later divorced, and she returned to Gaza with their son. In 2006, al-Ghul permanently took off her Islamic khimār (headscarf).

In 2009, al-Ghul reported being stopped and interrogated by Hamas after walking on a public beach near the Shati refugee camp in Gaza with a mixed-gender group of friends, while wearing jeans and a T-shirt with no headscarf, and laughing. The Associated Press said it was the first time since coming to power in 2007 that Hamas had tried to punish a woman for behaving in a way it viewed as un-Islamic. Al-Ghul says her male friends were subsequently detained for several hours, beaten, and then forced to sign statements saying they would not again "violate public moral standards." Hamas has denied that the incident took place.

In February 2011, al-Ghul said she was beaten while covering a rally expressing solidarity between Palestinians and Egyptians.

In March 2011, al-Ghul and seven other female Palestinian journalists said they were beaten and tortured by Hamas security forces while trying to cover rallies calling for Hamas to seek a peaceful reconciliation with Fatah. The Hamas government later apologized for some of the attacks and promised to launch an investigation.

At the age of 18, al-Ghul won the Palestinian Youth Literature award. In 2010, she received a Hellman/Hammett award from Human Rights Watch, aimed at helping writers "who dare to express ideas that criticize official public policy or people in power." Her work has been translated into English, Danish and Korean.

In 2012, al-Ghul was awarded the Courage in Journalism Award by the International Women's Media Foundation. She works for Lebanon's Samir Kassir Foundation, which advocates for media freedom.

On August 3, 2014, at least nine members from her family were killed in an Israeli airstrike, in Rafah, southern Gaza Strip.  In an essay, al-Ghul documents her experiences after hearing about the death of her family, entitled Never Ask Me About Peace Again.

In 2016, she published in French a book co-writing with Sélim Nassib, 'L'insoumise de Gaza', translated in English in 2018 by Mike Mitchell, 'A Rebel in Gaza: Behind the Lines of the Arab Spring, One Woman’s Story'.

References

1982 births
Living people
Palestinian women journalists
Palestinian feminists
Palestinian women writers